Europe '72: Wembley Empire Pool, London, England (4/7/1972) is a live album by the Grateful Dead.  It was released along with Europe '72 Volume 2 and the Europe '72 box set. It was the first concert of the tour. The next album after the Europe '72 series was Road Trips Volume 4 Number 5.

Track listing

Disc 1
First set:
"Greatest Story Ever Told" (Bob Weir, Mickey Hart, Robert Hunter) – 5:24
"Sugaree" (Jerry Garcia, Hunter) – 7:08
"Chinatown Shuffle" (Ron "Pigpen" McKernan) – 3:02
"Me and My Uncle" (John Phillips) – 3:38
"China Cat Sunflower" (Garcia, Hunter) > – 5:33
"I Know You Rider" (traditional, arranged by Grateful Dead) – 5:14
"Big Boss Man" (Al Smith, Luther Dixon) – 4:38
"Black-Throated Wind" (Weir, John Perry Barlow) – 5:55
"Loser" (Garcia, Hunter) – 6:55
"Mr. Charlie" (McKernan, Hunter) – 4:56
"Beat It On Down the Line" (Jesse Fuller) – 3:58
"Tennessee Jed" (Garcia, Hunter) – 7:02
Disc 2
"Playing in the Band" (Weir, Hart, Hunter) – 10:04
Second set:
"Truckin'" (Garcia, Phil Lesh, Weir, Hunter) > – 10:53
"Drums" (Bill Kreutzmann) > – 2:39
"The Other One" (Weir, Kreutzmann) > – 19:36
"El Paso" (Marty Robbins) > – 4:44
"The Other One" (Weir, Kreutzmann) > – 8:20
"Wharf Rat" (Garcia, Hunter) – 10:58
Disc 3
"Ramble On Rose" (Garcia, Hunter) – 6:21
"Sugar Magnolia" (Weir, Hunter) – 7:56
"Not Fade Away" (Norman Petty, Charles Hardin) > – 4:19
"Goin' Down the Road Feeling Bad" (traditional, arranged by Grateful Dead) > – 6:08
"Not Fade Away" (Petty, Hardin) – 3:42
Encore:
"One More Saturday Night" (Weir) – 4:36
Notes

References

Grateful Dead live albums
2011 live albums
Rhino Records live albums